Bremen is a home rule-class city in Muhlenberg County, Kentucky, in the United States. The population was 172 at the 2020 census.

History
The city was settled by German immigrants who named it after Bremen, Germany. A post office called Bremen has been in operation since 1832.

2021 tornado

In the late hours of December 10, 2021, a violent tornado tore through the town, causing major damage and killing 11 residents. The quad state tornado reached peak velocity and speed before it hit the city. The northern part of the city was totally destroyed and all other areas around the area were extremely damaged from high speed wind. The tornado forever changed the landscaping and look of the small town.

Geography
Bremen is located at  (37.363240, -87.217510).  The city is situated along Kentucky Route 81 northwest of Central City.

Demographics

As of the census of 2000, there were 365 people, 164 households, and 110 families residing in the city. The racial makeup of the city was 98.08% White, and 1.92% from two or more races. Hispanic or Latino of any race were 0.27% of the population.

There were 164 households, out of which 24.4% had children under the age of 18 living with them, 48.2% were married couples living together, 13.4% had a female householder with no husband present, and 32.9% were non-families. 28.7% of all households were made up of individuals, and 16.5% had someone living alone who was 65 years of age or older. The average household size was 2.23 and the average family size was 2.74.

In the city, the population was spread out, with 20.8% under the age of 18, 6.3% from 18 to 24, 27.9% from 25 to 44, 24.4% from 45 to 64, and 20.5% who were 65 years of age or older. The median age was 43 years. For every 100 females, there were 82.5 males. For every 100 females age 18 and over, there were 84.1 males.

The median income for a household in the city was $31,136, and the median income for a family was $36,094. Males had a median income of $24,712 versus $19,844 for females. The per capita income for the city was $14,959. About 10.6% of families and 10.5% of the population were below the poverty line, including 18.8% of those under age 18 and 7.8% of those age 65 or over.

References

External links

Cities in Kentucky
German-American culture in Kentucky
Cities in Muhlenberg County, Kentucky